James-Michael Johnson (born August 20, 1989) is a former American football linebacker. He was drafted by the Cleveland Browns in the fourth round of the 2012 NFL Draft. He played college football at Nevada.

Professional career

Cleveland Browns
Johnson was selected by the Cleveland Browns in the 4th round, 120th overall pick of the 2012 NFL Draft. On May 9, 2012, he signed a 4-year contract with the Browns. After being injured in the pre-season, Johnson returned to the Browns lineup in week 5 and made his first career start week 6. Johnson finished with a career high, 10 tackles, week 8 against the Chargers. Johnson's season finished with 36 tackles, and two stuffs in 10 games. On August 31, 2013 Johnson was waived.

Kansas City Chiefs 
On September 1, 2013, Johnson was claimed off waivers by the Kansas City Chiefs. In 2013, he recorded 17 tackles, one sack, and one forced fumble while playing all 16 games.

In Johnson's second season with the Chiefs he had his best season of his career. Johnson had 51 tackles and one forced fumble.

On September 5, 2015, Johnson was released by the Chiefs.

Tampa Bay Buccaneers 
On September 6, 2015, Johnson was claimed off waivers by the Tampa Bay Buccaneers.  On September 15, he was waived after suffering an injury.

Jacksonville Jaguars
On October 5, 2015, the Jacksonville Jaguars signed Johnson to provide depth at linebacker. The Jaguars released Johnson on October 28, 2015.

Detroit Lions 
Johnson was signed by the Detroit Lions on November 4, 2015. On November 14, 2015, the Lions waived Johnson.

Miami Dolphins 
Johnson was signed by the Miami Dolphins on November 17, 2015. On December 1, 2015, he was waived. On December 22, he was re-signed by the Dolphins. On September 3, 2016, he was released as part of final roster cuts.

References

External links
 
 
 Nevada Wolf Pack bio

1989 births
Living people
American football linebackers
Nevada Wolf Pack football players
Cleveland Browns players
Kansas City Chiefs players
Tampa Bay Buccaneers players
Jacksonville Jaguars players
Detroit Lions players
Miami Dolphins players
Players of American football from California
Sportspeople from Vallejo, California